Pavel Sergeyevich Mogilevets (born 25 January 1993) is a Russian professional footballer who plays as central midfielder for Uzbekistan Super League club Bunyodkor.

Club career
He made his debut in the Russian Premier League on 19 May 2013 for FC Zenit St. Petersburg in a game against FC Volga Nizhny Novgorod.

On 16 October 2020, his contract with FC Rubin Kazan was terminated by mutual consent. On the same day, he signed with FC Khimki.

On 18 July 2021 he signed a two-year contract with Russian Premier League newcomer FC Nizhny Novgorod.

International
He made his debut for the Russia national football team on 26 May 2014 in a friendly game against Slovakia. On 6 June 2014, he replaced injured Roman Shirokov in the Russian squad for the 2014 FIFA World Cup.

Career statistics

Club

Honours
Zenit Saint Petersburg
Russian Football Premier League: 2014–15

References

External links
 
 

1993 births
People from Kingisepp
Sportspeople from Leningrad Oblast
Living people
Russian footballers
Russia under-21 international footballers
Russia international footballers
Association football midfielders
FC Zenit Saint Petersburg players
FC Zenit-2 Saint Petersburg players
FC Rubin Kazan players
FC Rostov players
FC Khimki players
FC Nizhny Novgorod (2015) players
FC Bunyodkor players
Russian Premier League players
Russian Second League players
Uzbekistan Super League players
2014 FIFA World Cup players
Russian expatriate footballers
Expatriate footballers in Uzbekistan
Russian expatriate sportspeople in Uzbekistan